Asura magica is a moth of the family Erebidae. It is found in Taiwan.

References

magica
Moths described in 1917
Moths of Taiwan